Log Horizon is a Japanese light novel series written by Mamare Touno and illustrated by Kazuhiro Hara. It initially appeared in installments on the user-generated content site Shōsetsuka ni Narō ("So You Want to be a Novelist") starting on April 13, 2010, and subsequently published in book form by Enterbrain since March 2011. Yen Press obtained the rights on its light novel imprint to release the novels in English from 2015.

The novel series has received four manga adaptations, all written by Mamare Touno. The first adaptation is illustrated by Motoya Matsu and titled, Log Horizon Gaiden: Honey Moon Logs. It began serialization on January 27, 2012, and is published by ASCII Media Works in the Dengeki Daioh magazine. The second adaptation is illustrated by Kazuhiro Hara and titled Log Horizon. It began serialization on May 18, 2012, and was published by Enterbrain in the Famitsu Comic Clear web magazine. Yen Press obtained this manga for an English release. The third adaptation is illustrated by Koyuki and titled, Log Horizon: The West Wind Brigade. It began serialization on July 9, 2012, ended on March 9, 2018, and was published by Fujimi Shobo in the Age Premium magazine. Another manga illustrated by Sōchū and titled, Log Horizon Gaiden: Nyanta-honcho Shiawase no Recipe began serialization on December 21, 2012, ended on March 31, 2018, and was published by Enterbrain in the Comic B's LOG magazine an collected in six volumes. A manga Log Horizon: Kanami, Go! East! illustrated by Kou was serialized in Comic B's LOG from October 1, 2015, to December 1, 2016, and compiled in two volumes.



Volume list

Light novel

Several additional volumes have been released only as web-novels.

  (Destruction of the Round Table); completed January 7, 2017
  (Song of the Nightingales); completed April 16, 2017
  (Twilight Orphan); started August 2017

Manga

References

External links
 Log Horizon (Initially published edition) at Shōsetsuka ni Narō. 
 

Log Horizon
Log Horizon